Professor Tatyana Grigorievna Nazarenko (born 24 June 1944) is one of the leading Russian contemporary painters who has set new directions in Russian Art and Painting starting from the 1970s. She was born in Moscow where she still lives and works.

About her work
Her early works  "Execution of the Narodniks" (320x325 cm, 1972, Collection of the Russian Museum St. Petersburg; “Decembrists. Uprising of the Chernigov regiment” (160x180 cm, 1978, Collection State Tretyakov Gallery, Moscow; “Partisans have come" (160x120 cm, 1975, Collection State Tretyakov Gallery); "Moscow Evening" (160x180 cm, 1978, Collection State Tretyakov Gallery) and "Pugachof" (180x300 cm, 1980, Collection of the Museum Arbat-Prestige, Moscow) gained her recognition for innovative reflection of present reality in contemporary painting.

She later moves on to reflect the political changes and economic impact thereof in her Exhibition "Transition", an installation of over 120 life size Figures (Exhibition in 1996 in the Central House of Artists, Moscow).

She is an artist who continues to search for new ways to reflect the changing world around her, and who regularly surprises her spectators with new techniques such as the installation "Transition"; or in 2004 an exhibition featuring sculptured full size figures along with traditional painting in the Tretyakov Gallery in Moscow; in 2006 a large installation "Explosion" using full size polyurethane foam figures at the "Vanishing Reality" Exhibition in the Russian Museum in St. Petersburg (in the exhibition visitor's album it was written that "children should not be allowed to see this nightmare" and "an exhibition for schizophrenics" what provoked the Artist's comment that she is only reflecting the world around her), while in adjoining halls a selection of her career's works was on show; and in 2008 a video-art project. Meanwhile, she continues painting on canvas in a distinct and recognizable manner.

 "Scandalous and provocative as her latest works are, they testify to the feeling of tragedy that haunts the artist living in today’s world."

Credentials
Member of the Presidium of the Russian Academy of Arts
Professor with responsibility for a painting workshop at the Surikov Institute in Moscow
Was awarded several Government and Academic Awards
Received the Independent Triumph Award for 2008 for her contribution to Art and Culture.

References

Further reading

External links
Personal Website
Central House of Artists, Moscow
Credentials and Biography

Living people
20th-century Russian painters
21st-century Russian painters
Russian women painters
Artists from Moscow
1944 births
20th-century Russian women artists
21st-century Russian women artists